Franklinton may refer to a place in the United States:

Communities
 Franklinton, Georgia
 Franklinton, Louisiana
 Franklinton, New York, a populated place in the town of Broome in Schoharie County, New York
 Franklinton, North Carolina
 Franklinton, Columbus, Ohio, a historic neighborhood

Other
Franklinton Vlaie, a stream in the U.S. state of New York

See also
 Franklintown (disambiguation)